"Your Wildest Dreams" is a 1986 single by the progressive rock band the Moody Blues, written by Justin Hayward. The song was first released as a single, and later released on the Moody Blues' 1986 album The Other Side of Life.

Written by Hayward as a lookback toward his first love, the song features a synth-pop style that marked a stylistic departure from the band's standard lush pop sound. When released as a single, "Your Wildest Dreams" became the band's second biggest US hit, reaching number nine on the American charts.

Background
Moody Blues singer and guitarist Justin Hayward was inspired to write "Your Wildest Dreams" after reminiscing about his first love. Of the song's lyrics, he stated, "For me, wanting to know about the first girl you ever fell in love with, really fell in love with and broke her heart, you always want to know, I wonder what happened. I wonder where they are. Hop in to that time machine." According to Hayward, the song set off a "personal journey" to delve into his past, which he characterized as "fantastic, amazing, and disturbing."

Hayward has since noted the universal nature of the song's lyrics. He explained, "I thought 'Wildest Dreams' would be a throwaway thing that people wouldn't really take much notice of lyrically. But I found out that it was a common experience and desire by a lot of people. So that was very revealing."

Musically, "Your Wildest Dreams" featured a synth-heavy production that diverged from the band's traditionally lush arrangements. This was, in part, at the recommendation of producer Tony Visconti. Hayward noted,

The song is in the key of G major, with a tempo of 142 BPM.

Release
"Your Wildest Dreams" was released as the first single from the band's 1986 album The Other Side of Life. The song was a top-10 hit in the United States, peaking at number 9, the band's highest charting US single since the number two hit "Nights in White Satin" in 1972. Hayward attributed this commercial success in part to the support of the record company, commenting, "From our side of the fence … well, you’re linked with a record company and they choose to promote certain tracks. They either get on board or they don’t. In this case, we delivered the album and I traveled to New York City with it. There was a promotion guy and he jumped up when he saw me and shouted, 'Woooo eeee oooooo! Hey man, we have a hit!' People were behind it from the start. "

The song became an Adult Contemporary number-one hit, and charted at number two on the Mainstream Rock chart.

Cash Box said of the song that "a lilting and pretty mid-tempo marks The Moody Blues resurfacing."  Billboard said it "sounds more folksy, less spacey, but just as lyrical as [the Moody Blues'] classics."

Classic Rock critic Malcolm Dome rated it as the Moody Blues' 7th greatest song, saying that it "has a smooth pop rock vision that complements a simple, wistful melody with nostalgic lyrics."

"Your Wildest Dreams" was followed up by a sequel song, "I Know You're Out There Somewhere", from the 1988 Moody Blues album Sur la Mer. "I Know You're Out There Somewhere" was also released as a single, and its music video again featured Janet Spencer-Turner.

Music video
A music video for "Your Wildest Dreams" was produced and was directed by Brian Grant. It depicts Hayward and an unnamed woman throughout his career, showing how their relationship drifted apart as the band's success grew. Both are shown moving on while also wondering about each other and what might have been throughout the years, culminating her attending one of their performances. She tries to meet him backstage but is unsuccessful, as Hayward is ushered away before they can reunite. This storyline would later be continued in the music video for "I Know You're Out There Somewhere". The video received a Billboard Video of the Year award and saw heavy rotation on MTV. The actress in the video is Janet Spencer-Turner. In flashback scenes, the young Moody Blues are represented in the video by the British band Mood Six. The video was recognized as the "best overall video" at the Billboard Video Music Conference held in Los Angeles in November 1986. Grant was awarded the top director honor.

Hayward recalled that, initially, the band was meant to play themselves throughout the whole video, but their age prevented this. He explained, "[Grant] was like, 'It can't be you starring in the video, it's too personal and you're too old.' We still looked all right as 40-year-olds, but Brian was like, 'We need younger people for you all.

Personnel
 Justin Hayward – acoustic guitar, guitar synthesiser, vocals
 John Lodge – bass guitar, vocals
 Patrick Moraz – keyboards
 Graeme Edge – drums, percussion
 Ray Thomas - tambourine, vocals

Chart positions

Weekly charts

Year-end charts

References

External links
 

The Moody Blues songs
1986 songs
1986 singles
Songs written by Justin Hayward
Song recordings produced by Tony Visconti
Polydor Records singles
Songs about dreams